Jessica Mariette Adolfsson (born 15 July 1998) is a Swedish ice hockey player, currently playing with Linköping HC Dam of the Swedish Women's Hockey League (SDHL). She has previously represented Sweden in international competition and participated at the 2017 IIHF Women's World Championship.

References

External links

1998 births
Living people
Brynäs IF Dam players
Djurgårdens IF Hockey Dam players
Linköping HC Dam players
Penn State Nittany Lions women's ice hockey players
Sportspeople from Linköping
Swedish expatriate ice hockey players in the United States
Swedish women's ice hockey defencemen
Olympic ice hockey players of Sweden
Ice hockey players at the 2022 Winter Olympics